Saint Lucia competed at the 2017 World Championships in Athletics in London, United Kingdom, from 4–13 August 2017.

Results

Women
Field events

References

Nations at the 2017 World Championships in Athletics
World Championships in Athletics
Saint Lucia at the World Championships in Athletics